Philippe Lefort (born 30 November 1956) is a French diplomat. He is the Ambassador to the Republic of Korea. He was a graduate of the Ecole Normale Supérieure of Saint-Cloud and worked as a teacher of literature. While teaching literature, he entered the French Ecole Nationale d'Administration (School of Public Administration) and graduated in 1987. He served as French Ambassador to Georgia, Deputy Head of Mission in Russia, European Union Special Representative for South Caucasus and the Crisis in Georgia  and director of the Information Systems Bureau of the European Ministry of Foreign Affairs.

References 

Living people
1956 births
Ambassadors of France to South Korea
21st-century French diplomats
Ambassadors of France to Georgia (country)
Recipients of the Order of Prince Yaroslav the Wise, 3rd class